Lairg railway station is a railway station just south of the village of Lairg in the Highland council area of Scotland. ScotRail, who manage the station, operate all services.

History 
The station opened on 28 July 1874, as part of the Sutherland Railway, later becoming part of the Highland Railway and later the London, Midland and Scottish Railway.

Until April 2009 the station provided an interchange point for postbus services to the remote communities of Durness, Kinlochbervie and Tongue, Highland. Following considerable local opposition to the cancellation of the services they have now been replaced by temporary services operated, under contract from the Highland Council, by Stagecoach plc. The future of the services has yet to be determined.

Facilities 

Both platforms have waiting areas and benches, whilst there are also bike racks and a help point adjacent to platform 2. Platform 2 has step-free access from the car park, whilst platform 1 can only be accessed from the footbridge. As there are no facilities to purchase tickets, passengers must buy one in advance, or from the guard on the train.

Platform layout 
Platform 1 on the southbound line can accommodate trains having six coaches, but platform 2 on the northbound line can only hold five.

Passenger volume 

The statistics cover twelve month periods that start in April.

Services

Four Inverness to  via Thurso trains call here each way on weekdays and Saturdays (along with a fifth Inverness departure southbound in the early morning) and a single departure each way on Sundays.

References

Railway stations in Sutherland
Railway stations served by ScotRail
Railway stations in Great Britain opened in 1874
Former Highland Railway stations